John Kurtz Maxtone-Graham (August 2, 1929 – July 6, 2015) was a Scottish-American speaker and writer on ocean liners and maritime history.

Biography
Maxtone-Graham was born in Orange, New Jersey, to a Scottish father and an American mother. He graduated from Brown University in 1951. He served in the United States Marine Corps during the Korean War and then worked as a Broadway stage manager. In 1972 he wrote a social history and appreciation of the Atlantic express liners, The Only Way to Cross, which was a success as a mass-market publication.  This was followed by other books on express liner history. France/Norway was published in 2010; in March 2012 he wrote and published Titanic Tragedy; and in October 2014 he published his final book, SS United States: Red, White, & Blue Riband, Forever.

He was married twice and had four children. He is the father of writer Ian Maxtone-Graham. John Maxtone-Graham died from respiratory failure in Manhattan on July 6, 2015, aged 85.

See also
Frank O. Braynard

References

External links
 
 Brief biography, galaxsea.com; accessed August 28, 2014.

1929 births
2015 deaths
20th-century American historians
21st-century American historians
21st-century American male writers
20th-century American male writers
American maritime historians
American people of Scottish descent
United States Marine Corps personnel of the Korean War
Brown University alumni
Writers from Hoboken, New Jersey
Deaths from respiratory failure
People from Orange, New Jersey
American male non-fiction writers
Historians from New Jersey